Appomattox County is a United States county located in the Piedmont region and near the center of the Commonwealth of Virginia.  The county is part of the Lynchburg, VA Metropolitan Statistical Area, and its county seat is the town of Appomattox.

Appomattox County was created in 1845 from parts of four other Virginia counties.  The name of the county comes from the Appamatuck Indians, who lived in the area.  As of the 2020 census, the population was 16,119.

History 

Appomattox County was formed in 1845 from Buckingham, Prince Edward, Campbell, and Charlotte counties. In 1848, another part from Campbell County was added. It was named for the Appomattox River, which in turn was named for the Appamatuck, a historic Native American tribes in Virginia of the Algonquian-speaking Powhatan Confederacy.

Appomattox came to national attention on April 9, 1865, when Confederate General Robert E. Lee met with Union General Ulysses S. Grant at the village of Appomattox Court House to accept Lee's surrender. The surrender of Lee, which effectively ended the American Civil War, took place at the McLean House, home of Wilmer McLean.

Geography 

Adjacent counties
 Nelson County, Virginia - north
 Buckingham County, Virginia - northeast
 Prince Edward County, Virginia - southeast
 Charlotte County, Virginia - south
 Campbell County, Virginia - southwest
 Amherst County, Virginia - northwest

National protected area
 Appomattox Court House National Historical Park

Major highways

Demographics

2020 census

Note: the US Census treats Hispanic/Latino as an ethnic category. This table excludes Latinos from the racial categories and assigns them to a separate category. Hispanics/Latinos can be of any race.

2000 Census
As of the census of 2000, there were 13,705 people, 5,322 households, and 4,012 families residing in the county.  The population density was 41 people per square mile (16/km2).  There were 5,828 housing units at an average density of 18 per square mile (7/km2).  The racial makeup of the county was 75.94% White, 22.91% Black or African American, 0.13% Native American, 0.17% Asian, 0.02% Pacific Islander, 0.26% from other races, and 0.56% from two or more races.  0.47% of the population were Hispanic or Latino of any race.

There were 5,322 households, out of which 32.20% had children under the age of 18 living with them, 59.70% were married couples living together, 11.50% had a female householder with no husband present, and 24.60% were non-families. 21.30% of all households were made up of individuals, and 10.00% had someone living alone who was 65 years of age or older.  The average household size was 2.55 and the average family size was 2.94.

In the county, the population was spread out, with 24.70% under the age of 18, 7.10% from 18 to 24, 27.80% from 25 to 44, 25.60% from 45 to 64, and 14.80% who were 65 years of age or older.  The median age was 39 years.  For every 100 females there were 94.80 males.  For every 100 females age 18 and over, there were 91.10 males.

The median income for a household in the county was $36,507, and the median income for a family was $41,563. Males had a median income of $31,428 versus $21,367 for females. The per capita income for the county was $18,086.  11.40% of the population and 8.70% of families were below the poverty line.  Out of the total population, 14.10% of those under the age of 18 and 21.50% of those 65 and older were living below the poverty line.

Government

Board of Supervisors
Appomattox River district: William H. Hogan, Vice-Chairman (I)
Courthouse district: Samuel E. Carter Chairman (I)
Falling River district: John F. Hinkle
Piney Mountain district: Watkins Abbitt Jr.,(I)
Wreck Island district: Trevor L. Hipps

Constitutional officers
Clerk of the Circuit Court: Janet A. Hix (I)
Commissioner of the Revenue: Sara R. Henderson (I)
Commonwealth's Attorney: Leslie M. Fleet (I)
Sheriff: Donald D. Simpson (I)
Treasurer: Victoria C. Phelps (I)

Appomattox County is represented by Republican Mark Peake, in the Virginia Senate, Republican C. Matt Farris in the Virginia House of Delegates, and Republican Bob Good the U.S. House of Representatives.

Communities

Towns
Appomattox
Pamplin City

Census-designated place
Concord (primarily in Campbell County)

Other unincorporated communities

 Beckham
 Bent Creek
 Bowler
 Chap
 Evergreen
 Flood
 Fore Store
 Hixburg
 Hollywood
 Hurtsville
 Oakville
 Promise Land
 Spout Spring
 Spring Mills
 Stonewall
 Vera

See also
National Register of Historic Places listings in Appomattox County, Virginia

References

External links
Official County website
Official Tourism website for Town and County of Appomattox 
Appomattox Court House National Historical Park website

 
Virginia counties
1845 establishments in Virginia
Counties on the James River (Virginia)
Populated places established in 1845